Thalladi is a small town in Sri Lanka. It is located within Northern Province.

See also
 List of towns in Northern Province, Sri Lanka

External links

Towns in Mannar District
Nanaddan DS Division